Aplite is an intrusive igneous rock in which the mineral composition is the same as granite, but in which the grains are much finer, under 1 mm across. Quartz and feldspar are the dominant minerals.  The term aplite or aplitic is often used as a textural term to describe veins of quartz and feldspar with a fine to medium-grain "sugary" texture. Aplites are usually very fine-grained, white, grey or pinkish, and their constituents are visible only with the help of a magnifying lens. Dykes and veins of aplite are commonly observed traversing granitic bodies; they occur also, though less frequently, in syenites, diorites, quartz diabases, and gabbros.

Aplites usually have a genetic affinity to the rocks they intrude. The aplites of granite areas, for example, are the last part of the magma to crystallize, and correspond in composition to the quartzo-feldspathic aggregates that fill up the spaces between the early-formed minerals in the main body of the rock. They bear a considerable resemblance to the eutectic mixtures which are formed on the cooling of solutions of mineral salts, and remain liquid till the excess of either of the components has separated out, finally solidifying en masse when the proper proportions of the constituents and a suitable temperature are reached.

The essential components of aplites are quartz and alkali feldspar (the latter usually orthoclase or microperthite), microcline and albite. Crystallization has been apparently rapid (as the rocks are so fine-grained), and the ingredients have solidified almost at the same time. Hence their crystals are rather imperfect and fit closely to one another in a sort of fine mosaic of nearly equi-dimensional grains. Phenocrysts of feldspar occur occasionally and of quartz more seldom; but the relation of aplite to quartz-porphyry, granophyre and felsite is very close, as all these rocks have nearly the same chemical composition.

The aplites associated with diorites and quartz-diabases differ in minor respects from the common aplites which accompany granites. The accessory minerals of these rocks are principally oligoclase, muscovite, apatite and zircon. Biotite and all ferromagnesian minerals rarely appear in them, and never in considerable amounts. Riebeckite-granites have close affinities to aplites, shown especially in the prevalence of alkali feldspars. Tourmaline also occurs in some aplites.

The rocks of this group are very frequent in all areas where masses of granite are known. They form dykes and irregular veins, which may be only a few inches or many feet in diameter. Less frequently, aplite forms stocks or bosses, or occupies the edges or irregular portions of the interior of outcrops of granite. Syenite-aplites consist mainly of alkali feldspar; the diorite-aplites of plagioclase; there are nepheline-bearing aplites which intersect some elaeolite-syenites. In all cases, they bear the same relation to the parent masses. By increase of quartz, aplites pass gradually, in a few localities, through highly quartzose modifications into quartz veins.

References 

Felsic rocks
Phaneritic rocks
Plutonic rocks
Subvolcanic rocks